Indrasarowar is a Rural municipality located within the Makwanpur District of the Bagmati Province, Nepal.
The municipality spans  of area, with a total population of 17,585 according to a 2011 Nepal census.

On March 10, 2017, the Government of Nepal restructured the local level bodies into 753 new local level structures.
The previous Markhu, Kulekhani, Sisneri Mahadevsthan and Phakhel VDCs were merged to form Indrasarowar Rural Municipality.
Indrasarowar is divided into 5 wards, with Kalikatar declared the administrative center of the rural municipality.

Demographics
At the time of the 2011 Nepal census, Indrasarowar Rural Municipality had a population of 13,891. Of these, 71.6% spoke Tamang, 18.7% Nepali, 6.4% Newar, 1.8% Magar, 1.1% Lepcha, 0.1% Gurung, 0.1% Maithili and 0.2% other languages as their first language.

In terms of ethnicity/caste, 72.1% were Tamang, 8.5% Newar, 7.7% Chhetri, 6.6% Magar, 1.6% Hill Brahmin, 0.9% Hajam/Thakur, 0.9% Kami, 0.4% Damai/Dholi, 0.4% Thakuri, 0.2% Gurung, 0.2% Sanyasi/Dasnami, 0.1% Tharu and 0.4% others.

In terms of religion, 65.6% were Buddhist, 32.6% Hindu and 1.6% Christian.

References

External links
official website of the rural municipality

Rural municipalities in Makwanpur District
Rural municipalities of Nepal established in 2017